The Collection is the county museum and gallery for Lincolnshire in England. It is an amalgamation of the Usher Gallery and the City and County Museum. The museum part of the enterprise is housed in a new, purpose-built building close by the Usher Gallery in the city of Lincoln.

History 
The Collection has existed since 2005. It is a merger between the Usher Gallery, that was established in 1927, and the City and County Museum, that was founded in 1906. The first curator of the Lincoln City and County Museum was Arthur Smith (1869–1947), who was born in Leicester and raised in Grimsby and who was interested in natural history. After being appointed curator, he moved to Lincoln. He became the (honorary) secretary of the Lincolnshire Naturalists' Union (LNU), and acquired important collections, for example from J.E. Mason (Heteroptera, bugs), W. Wallace (Diptera, flies) and G.W. Mason (Lepidoptera, butterflies). The Museum also acquired important collections of bird specimen, for instance from George Henry Caton Haigh.

Smith retired as curator in 1935. He moved away from Lincoln and died in 1947.

Location
Lincoln consists of two parts, that at the top of the cliff and that in the Witham valley. The site of the collection is on the steep slope between the two and within the Roman colonia which linked the first century legionary fortress with the shipping and commerce in the river.

Buildings
The Usher Gallery was built to house the collection of James Ward Usher, using funds he bequeathed for the purpose. It was designed by the architect, Sir Reginald Blomfield and was officially opened on 25 May 1927 by the Prince of Wales. It is a simple building faced in stone with brick panels separated by simplified Tuscan pilasters above which is a frieze decorated with triglyphs and a roof line finished with a balustrade. The portico, central in the south façade, is topped by a broken pediment and urn finials. It stands in a small park on the hillside looking southwards across the lower town.

The Usher Gallery is the only purpose-built public art gallery in Lincolnshire and a Grade II* Listed Building. The Usher is owned by Lincoln City Council but leased to Lincolnshire County Council.

Following an architectural design competition managed by RIBA Competitions, Panter Hudspith Architects (project architect, Hugh Strange) designed the new building and it was opened in October 2005 after much hard work including an archaeological excavation. Despite the building having been designed to rest above the Roman horizon, at the foot of the pit for the lift shaft, was found the corner of a mosaic-paved passage which had been laid around a courtyard.

Much of the new building is faced and paved with Ancaster stone and borrows the concept of the glass-covered courtyard from the British Museum in a feature reminiscent of a medieval alley.

The main entrance is at the northern, uphill end and leads past, to the left, the café which faces south across a courtyard and to the right, the shop. Passing the reception desk leads to the orientation hall which is the glass-covered 'alley' passing east to west. From it, the visitor reaches auditorium where video or personal introductions to the museum or to education courses may be given; the education suite; the archaeological collection or the New Curtois Gallery, where touring exhibitions are housed. Below these last two, at the downhill end of the building, are the stores and workshops which service the whole.

Exhibits

The sample of mosaic, exposed by the pre-construction archaeological excavation is now on view inside as part of a display extending through all periods from the Ice age. The mosaic is the largest to be discovered in Lincoln for over a hundred years.

The archaeological exhibition in The Collection building is organised as a timeline from the stone age, through Roman, Anglo-Saxon (including the Horncastle boar's head) and Viking occupation to the Medieval.  Much of the Iron Age material is from the dig at Fiskerton, including the Fiskerton log boat.  It includes a satellite photograph of the county of Lincolnshire on a scale which permits fields and villages to be sought out while the picture's extent allows a general pattern of geology and the influence of the Roman roads to show through.

The long-established displays in the Usher Gallery include furniture, clocks and other forms of the decorative arts, from Usher's collection. There is a range of fine art works by J. M. W. Turner, John Piper and L. S. Lowry. The gallery's specialism is in the works of Peter De Wint, a former Lincoln resident. Other artists include works by: Ivon Hitchens, Charles Haslewood Shannon, Grayson Perry. Four galleries of various sizes are set aside for temporary exhibitions.

Modern and contemporary art programme
The Usher Gallery has an established programme of inviting contemporary curators and artists to exhibit modern and contemporary artwork in the main galleries alongside the Usher collection. In 2014, print works by Andy Warhol, Pablo Picasso, Salvador Dalí and Henri Matisse from the touring show Modern Masters went on display at the Museum. In 2013, conceptual artist and academic, Professor Raimi Gbadamosi was invited to curate the rehang display What's Going On, featuring loans from The Arts Council Collection, The British Art Medal Society and contemporary artists, Edward Allington, Kimathi Donkor, Amanda Francis, Permindar Kaur, Taslim Martin, Janette Parris, Ritu Sood, Susan Stockwell, Maiko Tsutsumi and Mark Woods

Gulbenkian Prize
In May 2006, The Collection was on a short list of four innovative museums being considered for the 2006 Gulbenkian Prize. The prize was awarded to SS Great Britain.

Possible closure of the Usher
Under 2019 proposals from Lincolnshire County Council, the Usher Gallery could be closed and the building turned into a wedding venue. The authority said it would look at moving some of the artwork to the neighbouring museum. The plans were criticised by art lovers. The county council was looking to save around £750,000 each year from its heritage budget. The council said it would save £100,000 per annum by ceasing to run the Usher as an art gallery. On 2 April 2019 a public meeting was held at Lincoln Minster School to discuss the issue, and on 13 April an art march was held.

Following discussions between the county council and the City of Lincoln Council, the Usher Gallery will remain open but the lease will be amended to enable third-party hire and ceremonies, and Lincoln's museum and art collections will remain in Lincolnshire.

References

External links

Brief for the new City and County museum
SLUG - Save Lincolnshire's Usher Gallery

1927 establishments in England
Art museums and galleries in Lincolnshire
Archaeological museums in England
City museums in the United Kingdom
Grade II* listed buildings in Lincolnshire
Grade II* listed museum buildings
Decorative arts museums in England
Museums established in 1927
Museums in Lincoln, England
Reginald Blomfield buildings